Indian Creek is a  long 3rd order tributary to the Deep River in Chatham County, North Carolina.

Course
Indian Creek rises about 0.5 miles west of Goldston, North Carolina and then flows southeasterly to join the Deep River about 1.5 miles southwest of Gulf, North Carolina.

Watershed
Indian Creek drains  of area, receives about 47.7 in/year of precipitation, has a wetness index of 408.42 and is about 54% forested.

See also
List of rivers of North Carolina

References

Rivers of North Carolina
Rivers of Chatham County, North Carolina